William Skiles may refer to:
 William W. Skiles, U.S. Representative from Ohio
 William West Skiles, American missionary
 William Vernon Skiles, professor of mathematics
 Bill Skiles, of American stand-up comedy act Skiles and Henderson